Tinney is an Irish surname. Notable people with the surname include:

Al Tinney (1921–2002), American jazz pianist
Frank Tinney (1886–1940), vaudeville entertainer
Joseph E. Tinney (April 24, 1910 – May 13, 2006), American attorney and politician 
Mary Catherine Tinney, Irish diplomat
Matt Tinney (21st century), reporter and weekend newsreader
Sheila Tinney, Irish mathematical physicist
Stuart Tinney (born 1964), Olympic-level equestrian rider
The Tinney Family, owners of Belcourt Castle in Newport, Rhode Island

See also
 Tinney, Ohio